Sium burchellii, known commonly as dwarf jellico, is a species of flowering plant in the family Apiaceae. It is endemic to Saint Helena. It grows on steep island cliffs. It is threatened by the fragmentation of its small populations, introduced species of plants, landslides, and possibly hybridization with Sium bracteatum.

References

burchellii
Flora of Saint Helena
Flora of Ascension Island
Flora of Tristan da Cunha
Endangered plants
Taxonomy articles created by Polbot
Taxobox binomials not recognized by IUCN